Decuriasuchus is an extinct genus of loricatan from the Middle Triassic period (Ladinian stage). It is a carnivorous archosaur that lived in what is now southern Brazil, in Paleorrota. It was first named by Marco Aurélio G. França, Jorge Ferigolo and Max C. Langer in 2011 and the type species is Decuriasuchus quartacolonia. The generic name means "unit of ten crocodiles" in Latin and Greek in reference to the ten known specimens and the animal's possible group behavior. The specific name refers to the Quarta Colonia region where the fossils were collected.

Description
Decuriasuchus is known from ten specimens, including nine articulated and associated skeletons, three of which have nearly complete skulls. The holotype MCN PV10105a consists of an articulated partial skeleton, lacking scapular girdle and limbs. Eight specimens associated with the holotype, MCN PV10105b-i, and the tenth specimen (MCN PV10004), consists of cranial remains from a different spot in the same locality. The specimens were found in the Alemoa Member of the Santa Maria Formation, Rosário do Sul Group. The discovery locality is Rio Grande do Sul, Brazil.

Like other rauisuchids, Decuriasuchus was a quadrupedal carnivore that was one of the top predators of its environment.

Classification

Decuriasuchus is closely related to the genera Prestosuchus and Batrachotomus. An initial phylogenetic study of the genus placed it in the family Prestosuchidae, but found the group "Rauisuchia" to be paraphyletic. The study was based on an earlier 2010 analysis of archosaurs. A later study involved adding Decuriasuchus to a 2011 analysis of archosaur relationships; D. quartacolonia was recovered as the basalmost member of the clade Loricata (the most inclusive clade containing Crocodylus niloticus but not Poposaurus gracilis, Ornithosuchus longidens or Aetosaurus ferratus), with Ticinosuchus as the next most primitive taxon. As a rauisuchian, Decuriasuchus is a distant relative of modern crocodilians.

Paleobiology

Nine specimens of Decuriasuchus were found in close proximity to each other. A study of the taphonomy of the site (the conditions under which the skeletons became fossilized) indicates that the assemblage represents the single burial of multiple individuals rather than the collection of unrelated remains in one spot over a longer period of time. The congregation of nine individuals in one area suggests that they may have been traveling in a group. If this were the case, Decuriasuchus would be the earliest known archosaur to exhibit group behavior.

References 

Paracrocodylomorphs
Prehistoric pseudosuchian genera
Triassic archosaurs
Ladinian genera
Middle Triassic reptiles of South America
Triassic Brazil
Fossils of Brazil
Santa Maria Formation
Fossil taxa described in 2011